Kiel McLeod (born December 30, 1982) is a Canadian former professional ice hockey centre. He most recently played for HC Pustertal Wölfe in the Italian Serie A. He joined the Wolves after a stints with EV Ravensburg of the 2nd Bundesliga and Frisk Asker of the GET-ligaen. He retired after the 2013-2014 season.

Playing career 
McLeod played his entire major junior hockey career in his hometown for the Kelowna Rockets. He was drafted in the second round, 53rd overall, in 2001 by the Columbus Blue Jackets. Upon signing an entry-level contract with the Blue Jackets, he was sent to the minors to develop his play in the American Hockey League however never received a recall before he was traded to the Phoenix Coyotes.

On December 28, 2005, McLeod was traded by the Coyotes to the Philadelphia Flyers in exchange for Eric Chouinard, and was immediately assigned to remain in the AHL with the Philadelphia Phantoms.
Throughout his professional playing career, McLeod has played for ten teams, in five leagues, and in five countries.

Career statistics

Awards and honours

References

External links 
 

1982 births
Albany River Rats players
Canadian ice hockey centres
Columbus Blue Jackets draft picks
EC VSV players
Frisk Asker Ishockey players
HC Pustertal Wölfe players
Ice hockey people from British Columbia
Kelowna Rockets players
Living people
Ravensburg Towerstars players
Philadelphia Phantoms players
San Antonio Rampage players
SG Cortina players
Sportspeople from Kelowna
Springfield Falcons players
Trenton Titans players
Utah Grizzlies (AHL) players
Victoria Salmon Kings players
Canadian expatriate ice hockey players in Austria